Filippo Scelzo (19 April 1900 – 9 October 1980) was an Italian film actor. He appeared in more than forty films including Red Passport in which he played the male lead.

Selected filmography

 Loyalty of Love (1934) - Il barone Salvotti
 Red Passport (1935) - Lorenzo Casati
 Tredici uomini e un cannone (1936) - Uomo #2
 Jeanne Doré (1938) - Perodot
 L'amor mio non muore! (1938)
 The Sons of the Marquis Lucera (1939) - Salvatore
 Le sorprese del divorzio (1939) - Enrico Duval
 Trial and Death of Socrates (1939) - Cebete
 Bridge of Glass (1940) - A Ponte de Vidro
 Kean (1940) - Il principe di Galles
 Piccolo alpino (1940) - Michele Rasi, suo padre
 Malombra (1942) - Un medico (uncredited)
 Piazza San Sepolcro (1942)
 Odessa in Flames (1942) - Michele Smirnoff
 Il nostro prossimo (1943) - Il padre di Paola
 The White Angel (1943) - Giovanni
 Tempesta sul golfo (1943) - Wolikof - il pittore
 La signora in nero (1943) - Raimondo
 Il fiore sotto gli occhi (1944) - Il proffesore Falcini
 Nessuno torna indietro (1945) - Guido Belluzzi
 The White Devil (1947) - Der Intelektuelle
 Man with the Grey Glove (1948) - Tambroni
 The Earth Cries Out (1949) - Professore Taumen
 Romanticismo (1949) - General Rienz
 Duel Without Honor (1950)
 Il Brigante Musolino (1950) - Public prosecutor
 The Count of Saint Elmo (1951) - Mancini
 The Ungrateful Heart (1951) - Avvocato difensore
 Frontier Wolf (1951)
 A Thief in Paradise (1952) - Chirurgo
 La voce del sangue (1952) - Donato Scala
 Gli uomini non guardano il cielo (1952) - Cardinal Ferrari
 The Secret of Three Points (1952) - Avvocato Mottola
 The Enemy (1952) - Notaio Ragaldi
 L'ingiusta condanna (1952)
 The Shadow (1954) - Il dottor Magre
 The Boatman of Amalfi (1954) - Padre Felice
 Io, Caterina (1957)
 Gold of Rome (1961) - Ludovico, President of the Jewish community
 The Verona Trial (1963) - Giovanni Marinelli
 Il Successo (1963) - Berto
 La corruzione (1963) - Professore
 Le piacevoli notti (1966) - Messer Bindo
 La bambolona (1968) - Giulio's father
 Bronte: cronaca di un massacro che i libri di storia non hanno raccontato (1972) - Padre Palermo (final film role)

References

External links

1900 births
1980 deaths
People from Ivrea
Italian male film actors
20th-century Italian male actors